Sokos Hotels is a Finnish hotel chain. It is the largest hotel chain in Finland, with a total of 49 hotels in 30 different cities and municipalities. Forty-five hotels are located in Finland, one in Tallinn, Estonia, and three in Saint Petersburg, Russia. 

Sokos Hotels is a part of S Group, which also operates the Sokos department store chain. Its S-Etukortti can be used at Sokos Hotels for customer ownership benefits. There is also S-Card, which can also be used at Sokos Hotels and other hotels and restaurants owned by S Group for benefits.

History 

Sokos Hotels was established in 1974 after grouping all of SOK's 1- to 5 -star hotels and motels into one hotel chain. Grand Hotel Tammer, Hotel Hamburger Börs, as well as Hotels Vaakuna, Torni, and Helsinki joined the hotel chain in the 1970s. Due to the 1973 oil crisis, hotel pools were not heated, and electricity was cut at night. According to Sokos Hotels, many hotels during this period were not yet equipped with in-room toilets and shower facilities. These hotels underwent major hotel renovations.

In the 1980s, S Group's French restaurant chain, Fransmanni, was established and introduced in Sokos Hotels. The first restaurant was opened in 1989 in Sokos Hotel Raumalinna in Rauma. S Group's Italian restaurant chain, Rosso, was already introduced in 1978. From 2016 to 2017, Fransmanni restaurants were converted into Frans & les Femmes bistros. Waterbeds, hot tubs, and minibars were also introduced in the 1980s. Exercise bikes and tanning devices were available for lending.

Due to the early 1990s recession, Finland underwent a financial depression. Hotels faced declining sales and worker amounts were reduced. In the mid-1990s, Sokos Hotels began cooperating with various amusement parks, ski resorts, and other leisure companies. New service packages were introduced: Lähde shopping packages, Avec pampering packages, Fun party packages, and Kids family packages.

In the 2000s, Sokos Hotels expanded to Russia and Estonia. Three new hotels were opened in Saint Petersburg. Hotel Palace Bridge and Hotel Vasilievsky were opened in Vasilyevsky Island in Saint Petersburg in 2008 and 2009 respectively. Hotel Olympic Garden was opened on the Moskovsky Prospekt in 2008. Additionally, Hotel Viru in Tallinn was added to the chain in 2007. Also during the 2000s, Sokos Hotels opened hotels that operate with leisure centers: Hotel Tahko, Hotel Koli, Hotel Vuokatti, and Hotel Flamingo. Hotel Levi in Kittilä was opened in 2008 and became Sokos Hotels' northern-most hotel. The chain purchases six spa hotels from Holiday Club.

From 2012 to 2013, Sokos Hotels underwent a brand reform, and its hotels were divided into three newly introduced hotel types: Break, Original, and Solo. In 2014, Sokos Hotel Torni Tampere in Tampere was opened and became Finland's second-tallest building. Sokos Hotels' newest hotels include Sokos Hotel Tripla in Helsinki and Sokos Hotel Kupittaa in Turku, both of which were opened in 2020.

List of hotels 
The Sokos Hotels chain consists of three hotel types: Break, Original, and Solo. Most of the hotels belong to the Original category. They are usually situated in city centers and include traditional hotel services. Hotels that belong to the Break category operate in connection with spas, ski resorts, and nature resorts. Hotels in the Solo category are more personalized and offer a higher level of service, according to Sokos Hotels.

Notes

References

See also 
 S Group
 Sokos

External links 

 Sokos Hotels official website in English
 S Group official website in English

Hotel chains in Finland